The president of the Indian National Congress is the chief executive of the Indian National Congress (INC), one of the principal political parties in India. Constitutionally, the president is elected by an electoral college composed of members drawn from the Pradesh Congress Committees and members of the All India Congress Committee (AICC). In the event of any emergency because of any cause such as the death or resignation of the president elected as above, the most senior general secretary discharges the routine functions of the president until the Working Committee appoints a provisional president pending the election of a regular president by the AICC. The president of the party has effectively been the party's national leader, head of the party's organisation, head of the Working Committee, the chief spokesman, and all chief Congress committees.

After the party's foundation in December 1885, Wyomesh Chandra Banerjee became its first president. From 1885 to 1933, the presidency had a term of one year only. From 1933 onwards, there was no such fixed term for the president. During Jawaharlal Nehru's premiership, he rarely held the Presidency of INC, even though he was always head of the Legislative Party. Despite being a party with a structure, Congress under Indira Gandhi did not hold any organisational elections after 1978. In 1978, Gandhi split from the INC and formed a new opposition party, popularly called Congress (I), which the national election commission declared to be the real Indian National Congress for the 1980 general election. Gandhi institutionalised the practice of having the same person as the Congress president and the prime minister of India after the formation of Congress (I). Her successors Rajiv Gandhi and P. V. Narasimha Rao also continued that practice. Nonetheless, in 2004, when the Congress was voted back into power, Manmohan Singh became the first and only prime minister not to be the president of the party since establishment of the practice of the president holding both positions.

A total of 61 people have served as the president of the Indian National Congress since its formation. Sonia Gandhi is the longest serving president of the party, having held the office for over twenty years from 1998 to 2017 and from 2019 to 2022. The latest election of president was held on 17 October 2022, in which Mallikarjun Kharge became the new president defeating Shashi Tharoor.

List of party presidents

The founding years (1885–1900)

The pre-independence era (1901–1947)

The post-independence era (1948–present)

See also 
List of chief ministers from the Indian National Congress
List of state presidents of the Indian National Congress
List of presidents of the Bharatiya Janata Party

References

External links 
 All India Congress Committee – AICC Official Indian National Congress website
 Sessions List

Presidents of the Indian National Congress
Indian political party presidents
1885 establishments in India
Presidents of the Indian National Congress